Roberto Gimelli (born 16 July 1982 in Canosa di Puglia, Italy) is an Italian footballer who plays as a defender. He is currently playing for Italian Lega Pro Prima Divisione team Pisa.

External links

Profile at aic.football.it 

1982 births
Living people
People from Canosa di Puglia
Italian footballers
Vastese Calcio 1902 players
U.S. Catanzaro 1929 players
U.S. Triestina Calcio 1918 players
U.S. Pistoiese 1921 players
A.C. Ancona players
Pisa S.C. players
U.S. Viterbese 1908 players
Serie C players
Association football defenders
Footballers from Apulia
Sportspeople from the Province of Barletta-Andria-Trani